Nottingham Woods is an unincorporated community in Kane County, Illinois, United States, located on Illinois Route 47,  north-northwest of Sugar Grove.

References

Unincorporated communities in Illinois
Unincorporated communities in Kane County, Illinois